Lake Hayden, also known as Hayden Lake, is a lake located Kootenai County, Idaho, United States. Hayden Lake is one of several natural lakes in northern Idaho; its shoreline is heavily populated with homes and it has limited public access. There are four boat launches, three of them public. The lake is part of the Spokane Valley–Rathdrum Prairie Aquifer.

Originally known as Lake Hayden, it is now more commonly known as Hayden Lake, to match the eponymous city located on the lakes shores.

See also

Lake Coeur d'Alene

References

Lakes of Idaho
Lakes of Kootenai County, Idaho